Richard Ellis (27 January 1842 – 23 December 1924) was a British-Maltese photographer who was one of the pioneers of photography in Malta during the late 19th and early 20th centuries. Born in St. Luke's, East London, he travelled throughout Europe as a circus performer before settling down in Malta at the age of nineteen. Within a few years he had opened a studio in Valletta, and he became a renowned photographer. His archive of tens of thousands of photographs still exists, and his work is significant for both its historic value and technical quality. His work is now in the public domain according to the law of Malta.

Early life

Ellis was born on 27 January 1842 in St Luke's, London to James and Sarah Ellis, who at that time already had 5 children and later would have 7 more.
 As a child he became apprenticed to the circus performers James and Sara Conroy. They travelled throughout Europe, with Ellis becoming a tightrope walker. During a trip to Paris, James Conroy and Richard Ellis became interested in photography and attended the Daguerre Institute. They later travelled throughout Italy and Sicily, but events related to the Italian unification led them to move to the nearest British colony, the Crown Colony of Malta. James, Sarah Conroy, their then-1 year old baby Adelaide Anceschi, and Richard Ellis arrived on the island in April 1861, where Richard became an apprentice in James Conroy's first studio in Senglea.

Career

On his arrival in Malta, James Conroy opened a Daguerreotype photography studio at 2 Strada Concezzione, Senglea where Ellis worked as his assistant. About 1865 James Conroy moved his studio to 134, Strada Stretta, Valletta, where they specialised in ambrotypes as well as albumen print including portraits and images of warships in the Grand Harbour. By 1870 James Conroy has opened additional premises at 56, Strada Stretta where mostly carte de visite were produced.

In 1871 Ellis set up his own studio at 43, Strada Stretta, Valletta. He was popular among both the locals and the British, since he had a British surname but was married to a Maltese woman. He soon became one of the leading photographers on the island, at a time when photography was still in its early stages. Ellis was active in multiple genres of photography, including views, portraits, still lifes and society photography. He was also proficient in developing, editing, printing, mounting and frame-making. Later on Ellis also dealt in photographic equipment.

His work is renowned both for its historical value and also its technical quality. Ellis' clients included King George V of the United Kingdom, King Albert I of Belgium, the German emperor, the queen of Portugal and various other European royals or nobles. His work has been featured in a number of publications, including in a 1920 issue of the National Geographic magazine and many posthumous publications. He was awarded several medals and trophies at exhibitions.

Throughout his decades-long career, Ellis created an archive of around 36,000 to 40,000 photographs, which document Malta's history during the last few decades of the 19th century and the first two decades of the 20th century. These record buildings, views and events, and they also show social change.

Other work and personal life
Ellis also tutored at the Malta Society of Arts, Manufactures and Commerce. He was a member of the organizing committee of the 24th International Eucharistic Congress held in 1913.

At the age of 22, Ellis married Alfonsina Curmi, a Maltese woman from Cospicua. They had a son named John. and two daughters, Amelia and Mary. Following Alfonsina's death, Ellis had another son outside of marriage. The child, Anthony, was not raised by his mother Giuseppina Farrugia but was instead left in the care of the Camilleri family of Victoria, Gozo to raise him with their own children. Anthony learnt many years afterwards that he was the son of Richard Ellis and was recognised as his son by virtue of a court judgment of 2 March 1944.

Ellis is buried at the cemetery of Santa Maria Addolorata ("Our Lady of Sorrows") in Paola, which is Malta's largest graveyard.

Legacy
After Ellis' death, his photography business was taken over by his son John, and eventually by his grandson Richard Jr. The focus of the firm moved from photography to frame-making in the 1990s. The business then passed to Richard Jr's nephew Ian Ellis, whose focus has been on maintaining the photography archive. Ian Ellis has published books showcasing Richard Ellis' photos, and he wants to establish a photography museum in Malta.

Ellis' work is in high demand by collectors of old photographs. Copyright on the photos by Richard Ellis expired in 1994, 70 years after his death.

References

Further reading

 The last of the Ellises, Business Today, 2008

1842 births
1924 deaths
British circus performers
Tightrope walkers
19th-century English photographers
20th-century British photographers
Maltese photographers
Pioneers of photography
British emigrants to Malta
19th-century Maltese people
19th-century circus performers